Kidd Field is an athletic facility used primarily by the University of Texas at El Paso (UTEP) in El Paso, Texas. Constructed for its then-primary use as a football field in 1938, it was the site of the Sun Bowl until 1963 when Sun Bowl Stadium opened. Kidd Field is used for track and field meets today. Kidd Field cost $2,000 to build, and El Paso holds an annual Easter festival there.  Built in the early 1930s, Kidd Field has been home to numerous All-Americans, national champions, national record-holders and Olympians. Named after UTEP (then Texas College of Mines and Metallurgy) professor and athletic booster John W. Kidd, the facility was shared with the UTEP football team until 1962, when the facility became sole home to the track and field team.  The track features an eight-lane Mondo Track, the same surface used for the 2004 Athens Olympic Games. The track was made possible by generous donations from Wayne and Russ Vandenburg of EPT Management and Mark Fry. The track was dedicated in former Miner legend Larry K. Durham's name. His contribution gave Kidd Field a makeover in 2011, and it was dedicated in his name in April 2012.  A state-of-the-art Daktronics video board was added in January 2008. The 9x15-foot LED video display plants fans right into the action on the track, providing graphics and video elements that display real-time highlights throughout a meet. The lit facility also houses throws and jumps arenas, making Kidd Field one of the top track-only complexes in the country.

References

External links
 UTEP Athletics Kidd Field

College track and field venues in the United States
Defunct college football venues
UTEP Miners football venues
UTEP Miners track and field
NCAA bowl game venues
Sun Bowl
Sports venues in El Paso, Texas
American football venues in Texas
Athletics (track and field) venues in Texas
1938 establishments in Texas
Sports venues completed in 1938